Corson is an unincorporated community in Brandon Township, Minnehaha County, South Dakota, United States with a population of 70. It lies immediately north of Interstate 90 and Brandon on South Dakota Highway 11. Once mainly a railroad and farming community, it is becoming an industrial area supporting the county. Sioux Falls is located twelve miles west-southwest of the community.
It is served by the BNSF Railway Company.

Etymology
Corson is named for Henry Tabor Corson (1838-1914), a resident of Sioux Falls, South Dakota, instrumental in constructing the Willmar and Sioux Falls Railway into Sioux Falls

Transportation

Interstate 90 is the town's major east–west route, and it connects the community to Sioux Falls. South Dakota Highway 11 (SD 11) runs as the major north–south route through the area. SD 11 connects Corson to nearby Brandon and Garretson.

Attractions
Corson is locally famous for two major attractions: The Playhouse, which is a small theater, and Bottoms Up, a bar. Both are conveniently located next to one another.

References

Unincorporated communities in Minnehaha County, South Dakota
Unincorporated communities in South Dakota
Sioux Falls, South Dakota metropolitan area